Kamilierikos or kamilieriko, is a kind of a Greek traditional dance, similar to fast zeibekiko and antikristos. Like zeibekiko, Kamilierikos is again in "9/8" signature  and was danced by the rebetes. Today, kamilierikos is very widespread in rebetiko and laiko music traditions.

See also
Greek dances
Greek music
Rebetes
Rebetiko

References

External links
Kamilierikos
The Zeybek Rhythms and Dances of Greece and Lesvos Island

Greek words and phrases
Greek dances
Rebetiko